Arab Ughluy, also rendered as Arab Ughlu or Arab Oghli, may refer to:
 Arab Ughluy-e Olya
 Arab Ughluy-e Sofla